This is the discography of Tony Yayo, an American rapper.

Albums

Studio albums 
{| class="wikitable plainrowheaders" style="text-align:center;"
! scope="col" rowspan="2" style="width:12em;" | Title
! scope="col" rowspan="2" style="width:18em;" | Album details
! scope="col" colspan="10" | Peak chart positions
! scope="col" rowspan="2" | Sales
|-
! scope="col" style="width:2.9em;font-size:90%;" | US
! scope="col" style="width:2.9em;font-size:90%;" | AUS
! scope="col" style="width:2.9em;font-size:90%;" | BEL(FL)
! scope="col" style="width:2.9em;font-size:90%;" | CAN
! scope="col" style="width:2.9em;font-size:90%;" | FRA
! scope="col" style="width:2.9em;font-size:90%;" | GER<ref>Peak chart positions for albums in Germany:
 All except Get Rich or Die Tryin''' soundtrack: 
 Get Rich or Die Tryin soundtrack: </ref>
! scope="col" style="width:2.9em;font-size:90%;" | IRE
! scope="col" style="width:2.9em;font-size:90%;" | NZ
! scope="col" style="width:2.9em;font-size:90%;" | SWI
! scope="col" style="width:2.9em;font-size:90%;" | UK
|-
! scope="row" |  Thoughts of a Predicate Felon
|
 Released: August 30, 2005 (US)
 Label: G-Unit, Interscope
 Format: CD, LP, digital download
| 2 || 72 || 50 || 3 || 50 || 34 || 23 || 38 || 58 || 41
|
 Worldwide: 1,000,000
|}

With G-Unit

 EPs 
EPs with G-Unit

Mixtapes

Singles
As lead artist

 As featured performer 

Other charted songsa.'''  "Drama Setter" charted at 34 on the Hot R&B/Hip-Hop Singles Sales chart.

Guest appearances

Music videos

As lead artist

References

Hip hop discographies
Discographies of American artists